The Council House, Coventry is a Tudor Revival style civic building which acts as the meeting place of Coventry City Council and was built in the early 20th century. It is a Grade II-listed building.

History 
The Council House was commissioned to replace St Mary's Guildhall as the headquarters of the mayor and city corporation. The site on Earl Street had previously been occupied by a row of shops. The foundation stone was laid on 12 June 1913 and the building was designed by Edward Garrett and Henry Walter Simister of Birmingham in the Elizabethan style. It was completed in 1917 although, because of the First World War, the official opening by the Duke of York only took place on 11 June 1920.

Statues designed by Henry Wilson depicting Leofric (who founded monasteries in Coventry), Godiva (who was patron of the local monasteries) and Justice were installed around and above the entrance in 1924.

During the Second World War, the bombings on the night of 14 November 1940, known as the Coventry Blitz, gave rise to some damage to the building including the destruction of the stained glass windows. The former Duke of York returned to the Council House as King George VI to survey the damage in the aftermath of the raid.

In September 2017 the council moved some 1,500 staff to its new 13-storey tower block at One Friargate.

References 

Buildings and structures in Coventry
Grade II listed buildings in the West Midlands (county)
City and town halls in the West Midlands (county)
Government buildings completed in 1917